Ruy Barbosa Popolizio (December 2, 1919 – June 8, 2014) was a Chilean businessman, politician, and oenologist. 

Barbosa served as the Minister of Agriculture from September 26, 1963, until November 3, 1964, as well as the Minister of National Assets briefly from September to November 1963. He later became the dean of the University of Chile from 1968 until 1969.

Death 
Barbosa Popolizio died in Santiago, Chile, on June 8, 2014, at the age of 94.

References

1919 births
2014 deaths
Ministers of Agriculture of Chile 
Government ministers of Chile
Academic staff of the University of Chile
Chilean businesspeople
Oenologists